The 1929 Londonderry by-election was held on 29 January 1929.  The by-election was held due to the appointment as high court judge of the incumbent UUP MP, Malcolm Macnaghten.  It was won by the UUP candidate Ronald Deane Ross.

References

1929 elections in the United Kingdom
By-elections to the Parliament of the United Kingdom in County Londonderry constituencies
Unopposed by-elections to the Parliament of the United Kingdom (need citation)
20th century in County Londonderry
1929 elections in Northern Ireland